Bauhaus 1979–1983 (sometimes referred to as simply 1979–1983) is a compilation album by English post-punk band Bauhaus, released in 1985 by record label Beggars Banquet.

Release 

Bauhaus 1979–1983 was originally released as a double album on vinyl in 1985. The album reached number 36 on the UK Albums Chart and has been certified silver by the British Phonographic Industry.

In 2009, Volume 1 was named by Spin as one of eight essential goth music albums.

Track listing

Personnel 

 Daniel Ash – guitar, vocals, saxophone, piano, keyboards, production
 Kevin Haskins – drums, percussion, production
 David J – bass, vocals, production
 Peter Murphy – vocals, production

 Technical

 Hugh Jones – production on "Spirit"

References

External links 

 

Bauhaus (band) compilation albums
Albums produced by Hugh Jones (producer)
1985 compilation albums
Beggars Banquet Records compilation albums